A Dog of the Regiment is a 1927 American silent drama film directed by D. Ross Lederman. This film is presumed lost. According to Warner Bros records the film earned $188,000 domestic and $59,000 foreign.

Plot
Based on a story by Albert S. Howson, the film traces the life of Rin-Tin-Tin "from the time he was a puppy to the time when he fell into the hands of an American, fighting in France." The American is an flyer whose plane went down behind German lines.

Cast
 Dorothy Gulliver as Marie von Waldorf
 Rin Tin Tin as Rinty
 Tom Gallery as Richard Harrison
 Hans Joby as Eric von Hager (as John Peters)

References

External links
 
 

1927 films
1927 drama films
1927 directorial debut films
1927 lost films
Silent American drama films
American silent feature films
1920s English-language films
American black-and-white films
Films directed by D. Ross Lederman
Warner Bros. films
Films set in Germany
Films set in the 1910s
American World War I films
Lost American films
Transitional sound drama films
Rin Tin Tin
Lost drama films
1920s American films